Ivanik or Iwanyk (Cyrillic: Иваник) is a gender-neutral Ukrainian surname. Notable people with the surname include:

Aleksandr Ivanik (born 1968), Russian sprint canoer 
Basil Iwanyk (born 1970), American film producer of Ukrainian origin

See also
Ivanyuk

Ukrainian-language surnames